PIC (usually pronounced as [pʰɪk]) is a family of microcontrollers made by Microchip Technology, derived from the PIC1650  originally developed by General Instrument's Microelectronics Division. The name PIC initially referred to Peripheral Interface Controller, and is currently expanded as Programmable Intelligent Computer.
The first parts of the family were available in 1976; by 2013 the company had shipped more than twelve billion individual parts, used in a wide variety of embedded systems.

The PIC was originally intended to be used with the General Instrument CP1600, the first commercially available single-chip 16-bit microprocessor. The CP1600 had a complex bus that made it difficult to interface with, and the PIC was introduced as a companion device offering ROM for program storage, RAM for temporary data handling, and a simple CPU for controlling the transfers. While this offered considerable power, GI's marketing was limited and the CP1600 was not a success. When the company spun off their chip division to form Microchip in 1985, sales of the CP1600 were all but dead. By this time, the PIC had formed a major market of its own, and it became one of the new company's primary products.

Early models only had mask ROM for code storage, but with its spinoff it was soon upgraded to use EPROM and then EEPROM which made it much easier for end-users to program. All current models use flash memory for program storage, and newer models allow the PIC to reprogram itself. Since then the line has seen significant change; memory is now available in 8-bit, 16-bit, and, in latest models, 32-bit wide. Program instructions vary in bit-count by family of PIC, and may be 12, 14, 16, or 24 bits long. The instruction set also varies by model, with more powerful chips adding instructions for digital signal processing functions. The hardware implementations of PIC devices range from 6-pin SMD, 8-pin DIP chips up to 144-pin SMD chips, with discrete I/O pins, ADC and DAC modules, and communications ports such as UART, I2C, CAN, and even USB. Low-power and high-speed variations exist for many types.

The manufacturer supplies computer software for development known as MPLAB X, assemblers and C/C++ compilers, and programmer/debugger hardware under the MPLAB and PICKit series. Third party and some open-source tools are also available. Some parts have in-circuit programming capability; low-cost development programmers are available as well as high-volume production programmers.

PIC devices are popular with both industrial developers and hobbyists due to their low cost, wide availability, large user base, an extensive collection of application notes, availability of low cost or free development tools, serial programming, and re-programmable flash-memory capability.

History

Original concept

The original PIC was intended to be used with General Instrument's new CP1600 16-bit central processing unit (CPU). In order to fit 16-bit data bus and address bus into a then-standard 40-pin dual inline package (DIP) chip, the two busses shared the same set of 16 connection pins. In order to communicate with the CPU, devices had to watch other pins on the CPU to determine if the data on the bus was an address or data. Since only one of these was being presented at a time, the devices had to watch the bus to go into address mode, see if that address was part of its memory mapped input/output range, "latch" that address and then wait for the data mode to turn on and then read the value. Additionally, the 1600 used several external pins to select which device it was attempting to talk to, further complicating the interfacing.

As interfacing devices to the 1600 could be complex, GI also released a series of support chips with all of the required circuitry built-in. These included keyboard drivers, cassette deck interfaces for storage, and a host of similar systems. For more complex systems, GI introduced the 8-bit PIC in 1975. The idea was that a device would use the PIC to handle all the interfacing with the host computer's CP1600, but also use its own internal processor to handle the actual device it was connected to. For instance, a floppy disk drive could be implemented with a PIC talking to the CPU on one side and the floppy disk controller on the other. In keeping with this idea, what would today be known as a microcontroller, the PIC included a small amount of read-only memory (ROM) that would be written with the user's device controller code, and a separate random access memory (RAM) for buffering and working with data. These were connected separately, making the PIC a Harvard architecture system with code and data being managed on separate internal pathways.

In theory, the combination of 1600 CPU and PIC device controllers provided a very high-performance device control system, one that was similar in power and performance to the channel controllers see on mainframe computers. In the floppy controller example, for instance, a single PIC could control the drive, provide a reasonable amount of buffering to improve performance, and then transfer data to and from the host computer using direct memory access (DMA) or through relatively simple code in the CPU. The downside to this approach was cost; while the PIC was not necessary for low-speed devices like a keyboard, many tasks would require one or more PICs to build out a complete system.

While the design concept had a number of attractive features, General Instrument never strongly marketed the 1600, preferring to deal only with large customers and ignoring the low-end market. This resulted in very little uptake of the system, with the Intellivision being the only really widespread use with about three million units. When GI spun off its chip division to form Microchip Technology in 1985, production of the CP1600 ended. By this time, however, the PIC had developed a large market of customers using it for a wide variety of roles, and the PIC went on to become one of the new company's primary products.

After the 1600
In 1985, General Instrument sold their microelectronics division and the new owners cancelled almost everything which by this time was mostly out-of-date. The PIC, however, was upgraded with an internal EPROM to produce a programmable channel controller.
At the same time Plessey in the UK released NMOS processors numbered PIC1650 and PIC1655 based on the GI design, using the same instruction sets, either user mask programmable or versions pre-programmed for auto-diallers and keyboard interfaces.

In 1998 Microchip introduced the PIC 16F84, a flash programmable and erasable version of its successful serial programmable PIC16C84. 
In 2001, Microchip introduced more Flash programmable devices, with full production commencing in 2002.{

Today, a huge variety of PICs are available with various on-board peripherals (serial communication modules, UARTs, motor control kernels, etc.) and program memory from 256 words to 64K words and more (a "word" is one assembly language instruction, varying in length from 8 to 16 bits, depending on the specific PIC micro family).

PIC and PICmicro are now registered trademarks of Microchip Technology. It is generally thought that PIC stands for Peripheral Interface Controller, although General Instruments' original acronym for the initial PIC1640 and PIC1650 devices was "Programmable Interface Controller".  The acronym was quickly replaced with "Programmable Intelligent Computer".

The Microchip 16C84 (PIC16x84), introduced in 1993, was the first Microchip CPU with on-chip EEPROM memory.

By 2013, Microchip was shipping over one billion PIC microcontrollers every year.

Device families
PIC micro chips are designed with a Harvard architecture, and are offered in various device families. The baseline and mid-range families use 8-bit wide data memory, and the high-end families use 16-bit data memory. The latest series, PIC32MZ is a 32-bit MIPS-based microcontroller. Instruction words are in sizes of 12-bit (PIC10 and PIC12), 14-bit (PIC16) and 24-bit (PIC24 and dsPIC). The binary representations of the machine instructions vary by family and are shown in PIC instruction listings.

Within these families, devices may be designated PICnnCxxx (CMOS) or PICnnFxxx (Flash). "C" devices are generally classified as "Not suitable for new development" (not actively promoted by Microchip).  The program memory of "C" devices is variously described as OTP, ROM, or EEPROM.  As of October 2016, the only OTP product classified as "In production" is the pic16HV540. "C" devices with quartz windows (for erasure), are in general no longer available.

PIC10 and PIC12
 
These devices feature a 12-bit wide code memory, a 32-byte register file, and a tiny two level deep call stack. They are represented by the PIC10 series, as well as by some PIC12 and PIC16 devices. Baseline devices are available in 6-pin to 40-pin packages.

Generally the first 7 to 9 bytes of the register file are special-purpose registers, and the remaining bytes are general purpose RAM.  Pointers are implemented using a register pair: after writing an address to the FSR (file select register), the INDF (indirect f) register becomes an alias for the addressed register. If banked RAM is implemented, the bank number is selected by the high 3 bits of the FSR.  This affects register numbers 16–31; registers 0–15 are global and not affected by the bank select bits.

Because of the very limited register space (5 bits), 4 rarely read registers were not assigned addresses, but written by special instructions (OPTION and TRIS).

The ROM address space is 512 and may only specify addresses in the first half of each 512-word page.  That is, the CALL instruction specifies the low 9 bits of the address, but only the low 8 bits of that address are a parameter of the instruction, while the 9th bit (bit 8) is implicitly specified as 0 by the CALL instruction itself.

Lookup tables are implemented using a computed GOTO (assignment to PCL register) into a table of RETLW instructions.  RETLW returns returning in the W register an 8-bit immediate constant that is encoded into the instruction.

This "baseline core" does not support interrupts; all I/O must be polled.  There are some "enhanced baseline" variants with interrupt support and a four-level call stack.

PIC10F32x devices feature a mid-range 14-bit wide code memory of 256 or 512 words, a 64-byte SRAM register file, and an 8-level deep hardware stack. These devices are available in 6-pin SMD and 8-pin DIP packages (with two pins unused). One input only and three I/O pins are available. A complex set of interrupts are available. Clocks are an internal calibrated high-frequency oscillator of 16 MHz with a choice of selectable speeds via software and a 31 kHz low-power source.

PIC16

These devices feature a 14-bit wide code memory, and an improved 8-level deep call stack. The instruction set differs very little from the baseline devices, but the two additional opcode bits allow 128 registers and 2048 words of code to be directly addressed.  There are a few additional miscellaneous instructions, and two additional 8-bit literal instructions, add and subtract.  The mid-range core is available in the majority of devices labeled PIC12 and PIC16.

The first 32 bytes of the register space are allocated to special-purpose registers; the remaining 96 bytes are used for general-purpose RAM.  If banked RAM is used, the high 16 registers (0x70–0x7F) are global, as are a few of the most important special-purpose registers, including the STATUS register which holds the RAM bank select bits.  (The other global registers are FSR and INDF, the low 8 bits of the program counter PCL, the PC high preload register PCLATH, and the master interrupt control register INTCON.)

The PCLATH register supplies high-order instruction address bits when the 8 bits supplied by a write to the PCL register, or the 11 bits supplied by a GOTO or CALL instruction, is not sufficient to address the available ROM space.

PIC17
The 17 series never became popular and has been superseded by the PIC18 architecture (however, see clones below). The 17 series is not recommended for new designs, and availability may be limited to users.

Improvements over earlier cores are 16-bit wide opcodes (allowing many new instructions), and a 16-level deep call stack. PIC17 devices were produced in packages from 40 to 68 pins.

The 17 series introduced a number of important new features:

 a memory mapped accumulator
 read access to code memory (table reads)
 direct register to register moves (prior cores needed to move registers through the accumulator)
 an external program memory interface to expand the code space
 an 8-bit × 8-bit hardware multiplier
 a second indirect register pair
 auto-increment/decrement addressing controlled by control bits in a status register (ALUSTA)

A significant limitation was that RAM space was limited to 256 bytes (26 bytes of special function registers, and 232 bytes of general-purpose RAM), with awkward bank-switching in the models that supported more.

PIC18
 
In 2000, Microchip introduced the PIC18 architecture. Unlike the 17 series, it has proven to be very popular, with a large number of device variants presently in manufacture. In contrast to earlier devices, which were more often than not programmed in assembly, C has become the predominant development language.

The 18 series inherits most of the features and instructions of the 17 series, while adding a number of important new features:

 call stack is 21 bits wide and much deeper (31 levels deep)
 the call stack may be read and written (TOSU:TOSH:TOSL registers)
 conditional branch instructions
 indexed addressing mode (PLUSW)
 extending the FSR registers to 12 bits, allowing them to linearly address the entire data address space
 the addition of another FSR register (bringing the number up to 3)

The RAM space is 12 bits, addressed using a 4-bit bank select register and an 8-bit offset in each instruction.  An additional "access" bit in each instruction selects between bank 0 (a=0) and the bank selected by the BSR (a=1).

A 1-level stack is also available for the STATUS, WREG and BSR registers.  They are saved on every interrupt, and may be restored on return.  If interrupts are disabled, they may also be used on subroutine call/return by setting the s bit (appending ", FAST" to the instruction).

The auto increment/decrement feature was improved by removing the control bits and adding four new indirect registers per FSR. Depending on which indirect file register is being accessed it is possible to postdecrement, postincrement, or preincrement FSR; or form the effective address by adding W to FSR.

In more advanced PIC18 devices, an "extended mode" is available which makes the addressing even more favorable to compiled code:

 a new offset addressing mode; some addresses which were relative to the access bank are now interpreted relative to the FSR2 register
 the addition of several new instructions, notable for manipulating the FSR registers.

PIC18 devices are still developed (2021) and fitted with CIP (Core Independent Peripherals)

PIC24 and dsPIC
 
In 2001, Microchip introduced the dsPIC series of chips, which entered mass production in late 2004. They are Microchip's first inherently 16-bit microcontrollers.  PIC24 devices are designed as general purpose microcontrollers.  dsPIC devices include digital signal processing capabilities in addition.

Although still similar to earlier PIC architectures, there are significant enhancements:

 All registers are 16 bits wide
 Program counter is 22 bits (Bits 22:1; bit 0 is always 0)
 Instructions are 24 bits wide
 Data address space expanded to 64 KiB
 First 2 KiB is reserved for peripheral control registers
 Data bank switching is not required unless RAM exceeds 62 KiB
 "f operand" direct addressing extended to 13 bits (8 KiB)
 16 W registers available for register-register operations.(But operations on f operands always reference W0.)
 Instructions come in byte and (16-bit) word forms
 Stack is in RAM (with W15 as stack pointer); there is no hardware stack
 W14 is the frame pointer
 Data stored in ROM may be accessed directly ("Program Space Visibility")
 Vectored interrupts for different interrupt sources

Some features are:

 (16×16)-bit single-cycle multiplication and other digital signal processing operations
 hardware multiply–accumulate (MAC)
 hardware divide assist (19 cycles for 32/16-bit divide)
 barrel shifting - For both accumulators and general purpose registers
 bit reversal
 hardware support for loop indexing
 peripheral direct memory access

dsPICs can be programmed in C using Microchip's XC16 compiler (formerly called C30) which is a variant of GCC.

Instruction ROM is 24 bits wide.  Software can access ROM in 16-bit words, where even words hold the least significant 16 bits of each instruction, and odd words hold the most significant 8 bits.  The high half of odd words reads as zero. The program counter is 23 bits wide, but the least significant bit is always 0, so there are 22 modifiable bits.

Instructions come in two main varieties, with most important operations (add, xor, shifts, etc.) allowing both forms.

The first is like the classic PIC instructions, with an operation between a specified f register (i.e. the first 8K of RAM) and a single accumulator W0, with a destination select bit selecting which is updated with the result.  (The W registers are memory-mapped. so the f operand may be any W register.)

The second form is more conventional, allowing three operands, which may be any of 16 W registers.  The destination and one of the sources also support addressing modes, allowing the operand to be in memory pointed to by a W register.

PIC32M MIPS-based line

PIC32MX
In November 2007, Microchip introduced the PIC32MX family of 32-bit microcontrollers, based on the MIPS32 M4K Core. The device can be programmed using the Microchip MPLAB C Compiler for PIC32 MCUs, a variant of the GCC compiler. The first 18 models currently in production (PIC32MX3xx and PIC32MX4xx) are pin to pin compatible and share the same peripherals set with the PIC24FxxGA0xx family of (16-bit) devices allowing the use of common libraries, software and hardware tools. Today, starting at 28 pin in small QFN packages up to high performance devices with Ethernet, CAN and USB OTG, full family range of mid-range 32-bit microcontrollers are available.

The PIC32 architecture brought a number of new features to Microchip portfolio, including:

 The highest execution speed 80 MIPS (120+ Dhrystone )
 The largest flash memory: 512 kB
 One instruction per clock cycle execution
 The first cached processor
 Allows execution from RAM
 Full Speed Host/Dual Role and OTG USB capabilities
 Full JTAG and 2-wire programming and debugging
 Real-time trace

PIC32MZ
In November 2013, Microchip introduced the PIC32MZ series of microcontrollers, based on the MIPS M14K core. The PIC32MZ series include:

 252 MHz core speed, 415 DMIPS
 Up to 2 MB Flash and 512KB RAM
 New peripherals including high-speed USB, crypto engine and SQI

In 2015, Microchip released the PIC32MZ EF family, using the updated MIPS M5150 Warrior M-class processor.

In 2017, Microchip introduced the PIC32MZ DA Family, featuring an integrated Graphics Controller, Graphics Processor and 32MB of DDR2 DRAM.

PIC32MM
In June 2016, Microchip introduced the PIC32MM family, specialized for low-power and low-cost applications. The PIC32MM features core-independent peripherals, sleep modes down to 500 nA, and 4 x 4 mm packages. The PIC32MM microcontrollers use the MIPS Technologies M4K, a 32-bit MIPS32 processor.
They are meant for very low power consumption and limited to 25 MHz.
Their key advantage is to support the 16bits instructions of MIPS making program size much more compact (about 40%)

PIC32MK
Microchip introduced the PIC32MK family in 2017, specialized for motor control, industrial control, Industrial Internet of Things (IIoT) and multi-channel CAN applications.

Core architecture
The PIC architecture is characterized by its multiple attributes:

 Separate code and data spaces (Harvard architecture).
 Except PIC32: The MIPS M4K architecture's separate data and instruction paths are effectively merged into a single common address space by the System Bus Matrix module.
 A small number of fixed-length instructions
 Most instructions are single-cycle (2 clock cycles, or 4 clock cycles in 8-bit models), with one delay cycle on branches and skips
 One accumulator (W0), the use of which (as source operand) is implied (i.e. is not encoded in the opcode)
 All RAM locations function as registers as both source and/or destination of math and other functions.
 A hardware stack for storing return addresses
 A small amount of addressable data space (32, 128, or 256 bytes, depending on the family), extended through banking
 Data-space mapped CPU, port, and peripheral registers
 ALU status flags are mapped into the data space
 The program counter is also mapped into the data space and writable (this is used to implement indirect jumps).

There is no distinction between memory space and register space because the RAM serves the job of both memory and registers, and the RAM is usually just referred to as the register file or simply as the registers.

Data space (RAM)
PICs have a set of registers that function as general-purpose RAM. Special-purpose control registers for on-chip hardware resources are also mapped into the data space.  The addressability of memory varies depending on device series, and all PIC device types have some banking mechanism to extend addressing to additional memory (but some device models have only one bank implemented).  Later series of devices feature move instructions, which can cover the whole addressable space, independent of the selected bank. In earlier devices, any register move must be achieved through the accumulator.

To implement indirect addressing, a "file select register" (FSR) and "indirect register" (INDF) are used. A register number is written to the FSR, after which reads from or writes to INDF will actually be from or to the register pointed to by FSR. Later devices extended this concept with post- and pre- increment/decrement for greater efficiency in accessing sequentially stored data. This also allows FSR to be treated almost like a stack pointer (SP).

External data memory is not directly addressable except in some PIC18 devices with high pin count.  However, general I/O ports can be used to implement a parallel bus or a serial interface for accessing external memory and other peripherals (using subroutines), with the caveat that such programmed memory access is (of course) much slower than access to the native memory of the PIC MCU.

Code space
The code space is generally implemented as on-chip ROM, EPROM or flash ROM. In general, there is no provision for storing code in external memory due to the lack of an external memory interface. The exceptions are PIC17 and select high pin count PIC18 devices.

Word size
All PICs handle (and address) data in 8-bit chunks. However, the unit of addressability of the code space is not generally the same as the data space. For example, PICs in the baseline (PIC12) and mid-range (PIC16) families have program memory addressable in the same wordsize as the instruction width, i.e. 12 or 14 bits respectively. In contrast, in the PIC18 series, the program memory is addressed in 8-bit increments (bytes), which differs from the instruction width of 16 bits.

In order to be clear, the program memory capacity is usually stated in number of (single-word) instructions, rather than in bytes.

Stacks
PICs have a hardware call stack, which is used to save return addresses. The hardware stack is not software-accessible on earlier devices, but this changed with the 18 series devices.

Hardware support for a general-purpose parameter stack was lacking in early series, but this greatly improved in the 18 series, making the 18 series architecture more friendly to high-level language compilers.

Instruction set
 
PIC's instructions vary from about 35 instructions for the low-end PICs to over 80 instructions for the high-end PICs. The instruction set includes instructions to perform a variety of operations on registers directly, the accumulator and a literal constant or the accumulator and a register, as well as for conditional execution, and program branching.

Some operations, such as bit setting and testing, can be performed on any numbered register, but bi-operand arithmetic operations always involve W (the accumulator), writing the result back to either W or the other operand register. To load a constant, it is necessary to load it into W before it can be moved into another register. On the older cores, all register moves needed to pass through W, but this changed on the "high-end" cores.

PIC cores have skip instructions, which are used for conditional execution and branching. The skip instructions are "skip if bit set" and "skip if bit not set". Because cores before PIC18 had only unconditional branch instructions, conditional jumps are implemented by a conditional skip (with the opposite condition) followed by an unconditional branch. Skips are also of utility for conditional execution of any immediate single following instruction.  It is possible to skip skip instructions.  For example, the instruction sequence "skip if A; skip if B; C" will execute C if A is true or if B is false.

The 18 series implemented shadow registers, registers which save several important registers during an interrupt, providing hardware support for automatically saving processor state when servicing interrupts.

In general, PIC instructions fall into five classes:

 Operation on working register (WREG) with 8-bit immediate ("literal") operand.  E.g. movlw (move literal to WREG), andlw (AND literal with WREG).  One instruction peculiar to the PIC is retlw, load immediate into WREG and return, which is used with computed branches to produce lookup tables.
 Operation with WREG and indexed register.  The result can be written to either the Working register (e.g. addwf reg,w). or the selected register (e.g. addwf reg,f).
 Bit operations.  These take a register number and a bit number, and perform one of 4 actions: set or clear a bit, and test and skip on set/clear.  The latter are used to perform conditional branches.  The usual ALU status flags are available in a numbered register so operations such as "branch on carry clear" are possible.
 Control transfers.  Other than the skip instructions previously mentioned, there are only two: goto and call.
 A few miscellaneous zero-operand instructions, such as return from subroutine, and sleep to enter low-power mode.

Performance
The architectural decisions are directed at the maximization of speed-to-cost ratio. The PIC architecture was among the first scalar CPU designs and is still among the simplest and cheapest. The Harvard architecture, in which instructions and data come from separate sources, simplifies timing and microcircuit design greatly, and this benefits clock speed, price, and power consumption.

The PIC instruction set is suited to implementation of fast lookup tables in the program space. Such lookups take one instruction and two instruction cycles.  Many functions can be modeled in this way.  Optimization is facilitated by the relatively large program space of the PIC (e.g. 4096 × 14-bit words on the 16F690) and by the design of the instruction set, which allows embedded constants.  For example, a branch instruction's target may be indexed by W, and execute a "RETLW", which does as it is named return with literal in W.

Interrupt latency is constant at three instruction cycles.  External interrupts have to be synchronized with the four-clock instruction cycle, otherwise there can be a one instruction cycle jitter. Internal interrupts are already synchronized. The constant interrupt latency allows PICs to achieve interrupt-driven low-jitter timing sequences. An example of this is a video sync pulse generator. This is no longer true in the newest PIC models, because they have a synchronous interrupt latency of three or four cycles.

Advantages
 Small instruction set to learn
 RISC architecture
 Built-in oscillator with selectable speeds
 Easy entry level, in-circuit programming plus in-circuit debugging PICkit units available for less than $50
 Inexpensive microcontrollers
 Wide range of interfaces including I²C, SPI, USB, UART, A/D, programmable comparators, PWM, LIN, CAN, PSP, and Ethernet
 Availability of processors in DIL package make them easy to handle for hobby use.

Limitations
 One accumulator
 Register-bank switching is required to access the entire RAM of many devices
 Operations and registers are not orthogonal; some instructions can address RAM and/or immediate constants, while others can use the accumulator only.

The following stack limitations have been addressed in the PIC18 series, but still apply to earlier cores:

 The hardware call stack is not addressable, so preemptive task switching cannot be implemented
 Software-implemented stacks are not efficient, so it is difficult to generate reentrant code and support local variables

With paged program memory, there are two page sizes to worry about: one for CALL and GOTO and another for computed GOTO (typically used for table lookups). For example, on PIC16, CALL and GOTO have 11 bits of addressing, so the page size is 2048 instruction words. For computed GOTOs, where you add to PCL, the page size is 256 instruction words. In both cases, the upper address bits are provided by the PCLATH register. This register must be changed every time control transfers between pages. PCLATH must also be preserved by any interrupt handler.

Compiler development
While several commercial compilers are available, in 2008, Microchip released their own C compilers, C18 and C30, for the line of 18F 24F and 30/33F processors.

As of 2013, Microchip offers their XC series of compilers, for use with MPLAB X.  Microchip will eventually phase out its older compilers, such as C18, and recommends using their XC series compilers for new designs.

The RISC instruction set of the PIC assembly language code can make the overall flow difficult to comprehend. Judicious use of simple macros can increase the readability of PIC assembly language. For example, the original Parallax PIC assembler ("SPASM") has macros, which hide W and make the PIC look like a two-address machine. It has macro instructions like mov b, a (move the data from address a to address b) and add b, a (add data from address a to data in address b).  It also hides the skip instructions by providing three-operand branch macro instructions, such as cjne a, b, dest (compare a with b and jump to dest if they are not equal).

Hardware features
PIC devices generally feature:

 Flash memory (program memory, programmed using MPLAB devices)
 SRAM (data memory)
 EEPROM memory (programmable at run-time)
 Sleep mode (power savings)
 Watchdog timer
 Various crystal or RC oscillator configurations, or an external clock

Variants
Within a series, there are still many device variants depending on what hardware resources the chip features:

 General purpose I/O pins
 Internal clock oscillators
 8/16/32 bit timers
 Synchronous/Asynchronous Serial Interface USART
 MSSP Peripheral for I²C and SPI communications
 Capture/Compare and PWM modules
 Analog-to-digital converters (up to ~1.0 Msps)
 USB, Ethernet, CAN interfacing support
 External memory interface
 Integrated analog RF front ends (PIC16F639, and rfPIC).
 KEELOQ Rolling code encryption peripheral (encode/decode)
 And many more

Trends
The first generation of PICs with EPROM storage are almost completely replaced by chips with Flash memory. Likewise, the original 12-bit instruction set of the PIC1650 and its direct descendants has been superseded by 14-bit and 16-bit instruction sets. Microchip still sells OTP (one-time-programmable) and windowed (UV-erasable) versions of some of its EPROM based PICs for legacy support or volume orders. The Microchip website lists PICs that are not electrically erasable as OTP. UV erasable windowed versions of these chips can be ordered.

Part number
The F in a PICMicro part number generally indicates the PICmicro uses flash memory and can be erased electronically. Conversely, a C generally means it can only be erased by exposing the die to ultraviolet light (which is only possible if a windowed package style is used). An exception to this rule is the PIC16C84 which uses EEPROM and is therefore electrically erasable.

An L in the name indicates the part will run at a lower voltage, often with frequency limits imposed. Parts designed specifically for low voltage operation, within a strict range of 3 - 3.6 volts, are marked with a J in the part number. These parts are also uniquely I/O tolerant as they will accept up to 5 V as inputs.

Development tools

Microchip provides a freeware IDE package called MPLAB X, which includes an assembler, linker, software simulator, and debugger. They also sell C compilers for the PIC10, PIC12, PIC16, PIC18, PIC24, PIC32 and dsPIC, which integrate cleanly with MPLAB X. Free versions of the C compilers are also available with all features. But for the free versions, optimizations will be disabled after 60 days.

Several third parties develop C language compilers for PICs, many of which integrate to MPLAB and/or feature their own IDE. A fully featured compiler for the PICBASIC language to program PIC microcontrollers is available from meLabs, Inc. Mikroelektronika offers PIC compilers in C, BASIC and Pascal programming languages.

A graphical programming language, Flowcode, exists capable of programming 8- and 16-bit PIC devices and generating PIC-compatible C code. It exists in numerous versions from a free demonstration to a more complete professional edition.

The Proteus Design Suite is able to simulate many of the popular 8 and 16-bit PIC devices along with other circuitry that is connected to the PIC on the schematic. The program to be simulated can be developed within Proteus itself, MPLAB or any other development tool.

Device programmers

Devices called "programmers" are traditionally used to get program code into the target PIC. Most PICs that Microchip currently sells feature ICSP (in-circuit serial programming) and/or LVP (low-voltage programming) capabilities, allowing the PIC to be programmed while it is sitting in the target circuit.

Microchip offers programmers/debuggers under the MPLAB and PICKit series. MPLAB ICD4 and MPLAB REAL ICE are the current programmers and debuggers for professional engineering, while PICKit 3 is a low-cost programmer / debugger line for hobbyists and students.

Bootloading
Many of the higher end flash based PICs can also self-program (write to their own program memory), a process known as bootloading. Demo boards are available with a small bootloader factory programmed that can be used to load user programs over an interface such as RS-232 or USB, thus obviating the need for a programmer device.

Alternatively there is bootloader firmware available that the user can load onto the PIC using ICSP. After programming the bootloader onto the PIC, the user can then reprogram the device using RS232 or USB, in conjunction with specialized computer software.

The advantages of a bootloader over ICSP is faster programming speeds, immediate program execution following programming, and the ability to both debug and program using the same cable.

Third party
There are many programmers for PIC microcontrollers, ranging from the extremely simple designs which rely on ICSP to allow direct download of code from a host computer, to intelligent programmers that can verify the device at several supply voltages. Many of these complex programmers use a pre-programmed PIC themselves to send the programming commands to the PIC that is to be programmed. The intelligent type of programmer is needed to program earlier PIC models (mostly EPROM type) which do not support in-circuit programming.

Third party programmers range from plans to build your own, to self-assembly kits and fully tested ready-to-go units. Some are simple designs which require a PC to do the low-level programming signalling (these typically connect to the serial or parallel port and consist of a few simple components), while others have the programming logic built into them (these typically use a serial or USB connection, are usually faster, and are often built using PICs themselves for control).

Debugging

In-circuit debugging
All newer PIC devices feature an ICD (in-circuit debugging) interface, built into the CPU core, that allows for interactive debugging of the program in conjunction with MPLAB IDE. MPLAB ICD and MPLAB REAL ICE debuggers can communicate with this interface using the ICSP interface.

This debugging system comes at a price however, namely limited breakpoint count (1 on older devices, 3 on newer devices), loss of some I/O (with the exception of some surface mount 44-pin PICs which have dedicated lines for debugging) and loss of some on-chip features.

Some devices do not have on-chip debug support, due to cost or lack of pins. Some larger chips also have no debug module. To debug these devices, a special -ICD version of the chip mounted on a daughter board which provides dedicated ports is required. Some of these debug chips are able to operate as more than one type of chip by the use of selectable jumpers on the daughter board. This allows broadly identical architectures that do not feature all the on chip peripheral devices to be replaced by a single -ICD chip. For example: the 12F690-ICD will function as one of six different parts each of which features one, some or all of five on chip peripherals.

In-circuit emulators
Microchip offers three full in-circuit emulators: the MPLAB ICE2000 (parallel interface, a USB converter is available); the newer MPLAB ICE4000 (USB 2.0 connection); and most recently, the REAL ICE (USB 2.0 connection). All such tools are typically used in conjunction with MPLAB IDE for source-level interactive debugging of code running on the target.

Operating systems
PIC projects may utilize real-time operating systems such as FreeRTOS, AVIX RTOS, uRTOS, Salvo RTOS or other similar libraries for task scheduling and prioritization.

An open source project by Serge Vakulenko adapts 2.11BSD to the PIC32 architecture, under the name RetroBSD. This brings a familiar Unix-like operating system, including an onboard development environment, to the microcontroller, within the constraints of the onboard hardware.

Clones

Parallax

Parallax produced a series of PICmicro-like microcontrollers known as the Parallax SX. It is currently discontinued. Designed to be architecturally similar to the PIC microcontrollers used in the original versions of the BASIC Stamp, SX microcontrollers replaced the PIC in several subsequent versions of that product.

Parallax's SX are 8-bit RISC microcontrollers, using a 12-bit instruction word, which run fast at 75 MHz (75 MIPS). They include up to 4096 12-bit words of flash memory and up to 262 bytes of random access memory, an eight bit counter and other support logic. There are software library modules to emulate I²C and SPI interfaces, UARTs, frequency generators, measurement counters and PWM and sigma-delta A/D converters. Other interfaces are relatively easy to write, and existing modules can be modified to get new features.

PKK Milandr

Russian PKK Milandr produces microcontrollers using the PIC17 architecture as the 1886 series.

Program memory consists of up to 64kB Flash memory in the 1886VE2U or 8kB EEPROM in the 1886VE5U (1886ВЕ5У). The 1886VE5U (1886ВЕ5У) through 1886VE7U (1886ВЕ7У) are specified for the military temperature range of -60 °C to +125 °C. Hardware interfaces in the various parts include USB, CAN, I2C, SPI, as well as A/D and D/A converters. The 1886VE3U (1886ВЕ3У) contains a hardware accelerator for cryptographic functions according to GOST 28147-89. There are even radiation-hardened chips with the designations 1886VE8U (1886ВЕ8У) and 1886VE10U (1886ВЕ10У).

ELAN Microelectronics

ELAN Microelectronics Corp. in Taiwan make a line of microcontrollers based on the PIC16 architecture, with 13-bit instructions and a smaller (6-bit) RAM address space.

Holtek Semiconductor

Holtek Semiconductor make a large number of very cheap microcontrollers (as low as 8.5 cents in quantity) with a 14-bit instruction set strikingly similar to the PIC16.

Other manufacturers in Asia
Many ultra-low-cost OTP microcontrollers from Asian manufacturers, found in low-cost consumer electronics are based on the PIC architecture or modified form.   Most clones only target the baseline parts (PIC16C5x/PIC12C50x).  Microchip has attempted to sue some manufacturers when the copying is particularly egregious,
without success.

See also
 PIC16x84
 Atmel AVR
 Arduino
 BASIC Atom
 BASIC Stamp
 OOPic
 PICAXE
 TI MSP430
 Maximite

References

Further reading
 Microcontroller Theory and Applications, with the PIC18F; 2nd Ed; M. Rafiquzzaman; Wiley; 544 pages; 2018; .
 Microcontroller System Design Using PIC18F Processors; Nicolas K. Haddad; IGI Global; 428 pages; 2017; .
 PIC Microcontroller Projects in C: Basic to Advanced (for PIC18F); 2nd Ed; Dogan Ibrahim; Newnes; 660 pages; 2014; . (1st Ed)
 Microcontroller Programming: Microchip PIC; Sanchez and Canton; CRC Press; 824 pages; 2006; . (1st Ed)
 PIC Microcontroller Project Book; John Iovine; TAB; 272 pages; 2000; . (1st Ed)

External links

 .
 Official Microchip website
 PIC wifi projects website

Microcontrollers
Microchip Technology hardware